Secretary Kerry may refer to:
John Kerry, the 68th U.S. Secretary of State
Cameron Kerry, brother of John Kerry and acting U.S. Secretary of Commerce from June 1–26, 2013